General elections were held in Gibraltar on 8 December 2011. Two parties, the Gibraltar Social Democrats (GSD) and the Progressive Democrative Party (PDP) and an alliance of the Gibraltar Socialist Labour Party (GSLP) and the Liberal Party of Gibraltar (LPG) each presented a full slate of ten candidates each, making a total of thirty candidates standing for seventeen seats in the Gibraltar Parliament. Members of Parliament in Gibraltar are elected "at-large" in a single electoral area covering the whole territory.

Several pre-election polls gave the GSLP an advantage of up to 9% over the governing party, the GSD, while one (that of the Spanish newspaper Area, which published no details and was widely thought to be politically motivated) predicted a GSD win.

Contesting parties
Two parties, the Gibraltar Social Democrats (GSD) and the Progressive Democratic Party (PDP), and an alliance (Gibraltar Socialist Labour Party (GSLP)/Liberals) have presented a full slate of 10 candidates each, making a total of 30 candidates for 17 seats in the Gibraltar Parliament.

Opinion polls
Several pre-election polls gave the GSLP an advantage of up to 9% over the governing party, the GSD, while one (that of Spanish paper Area, which published no details and was thought to be politically motivated) predicted a GSD win.

Results

References

General elections in Gibraltar
Gibraltar
General
Gibraltar
Election and referendum articles with incomplete results